Castelfidardo (Marchigiano: Castello) is a town and comune in the province of Ancona, in the Marche  region of central-eastern Italy.

It is  remembered for a Piedmontese victory over an army composed of foreign volunteers defending the Papal States, on September 18, 1860.  The town's Museum of the Risorgimento, in the palazzo Mordini, commemorates the battle and places it in the wider context of the Risorgimento as a whole.  It houses artifacts and documents of the period, including around 130 loans from private collections or other museums.  In addition, Castelfidardo is home to a number of Renaissance-era buildings, including 'il Palombarone` a 1580 construction which underwent extensive renovations in the early 21st century.

Economy
Castelfidardo is the international capital of accordion builders. A variety of other musical instruments besides the accordion have been produced in the town since the 19th century, such as the armonica.

Twin towns
 Castelvetro di Modena, Italy
 Klingenthal, Germany

Sport 
G.S.D. Castelfidardo Calcio is the Italian football of the city and was founded in 1944. Currently it plays in Italy's Serie D after the promotion from national play-off in the Eccellenza in the 2013–14 season.
  
Its home ground is Stadio G. Mancini with 2,000 seats. The team's colors are white and green.

References

Hilltowns in the Marche